Myinmoletkat Taung is the highest mountain in Myanmar Tanintharyi Region. Located on the Bilauktaung, Tenasserim Hills, Burma.

Geography

See also
List of Ultras of Southeast Asia
List of mountains in Burma

References

External links
Peakbagger Myinmoletkat Taung, Myanmar
Google Books, The Physical Geography of Southeast Asia

Mountains of Myanmar
Tenasserim Hills
Tanintharyi Region